Guaviraví River is a river in Corrientes Province, Argentina. It flows into Uruguay River. It once was called Yapeyú River.

See also
Guaviraví, Corrientes

Rivers of Argentina